The Purple Party (PM) is a centrist, liberal and progressive Peruvian political party. The color purple was chosen to represent the blending of red and blue, the colors of left and right-wing parties in Peru, symbolizing the centrist ideology of the party.

History
On 17 October 2016, Julio Guzmán led the First Purple Summit in Lima, Peru, announcing the organization's first steps towards making a party. More than 1,000 individuals participated in establishing guidelines for the political movement. At the Second Purple Summit (October 14–15, 2017), held in Cusco, with the participation of more than 1,000 national representatives, the presentation of their file for party registration with the corresponding Peruvian body was reported. On 18 November 2017, the party was officially founded. At the Third Purple Summit (October 13–14, 2018), held in Ayacucho, where more than 1,300 representatives from all over the country attended, the registration and consolidation work of the next party to be formalized was evaluated. After a long process of signature collection for registration, the party was legally recognized by the National Elections Jury on 4 March 2019.

At the Fourth Purple Summit (October 25–26, 2019), held in Trujillo. The assembly had 1800 representatives, and its objective was to prepare the organization of the party for the next extraordinary congressional elections in January of the following year.

On the other hand, Alberto de Belaunde and Gino Costa from the Liberal Bench joined the Purple Party and won respective seats during the extraordinary parliamentary elections of 2020.

At the 2020 snap parliamentary election on 26 January 2020, the party won 7.4% of the popular vote and 9 out of 130 seats in the Congress of the Republic.

Presidency of Francisco Sagasti

Background
Following the removal of Martín Vizcarra and Manuel Merino's ascension to the presidency, the 2020 Peruvian protests kicked-off. The party's congressional caucus voted against Vizcarra's removal, being the only party which remained in full-opposition to the political move. Refusing to attend Merino's inauguration, congressman Daniel Olivares plead for the release of arbitrarily detained citizens at police stations, while Guzmán participated in the protests. The rest of the caucus remained vigilant against actions taken by Merino's government, which ended on 15 November 2020, only five days into his presidency.

As Merino's resignation was accepted, Congress voted to elect a new Congress President between the 19 congress members who voted against Vizcarra's removal on 9 November. Talks to select a Purple congressman for the position initiated. Congressman Gino Costa was the first proposal, but was unanimously rejected by the rest of caucuses. On the evening of 15 November 2020, Francisco Sagasti was proposed to run for the First Vice Presidency of Congress in a multiparty list led by leftist congresswoman Rocío Silva-Santisteban (FA). The single list was officially rejected by Congress, prompting to hold the election till the next day. In this second election, Francisco Sagasti led the multiparty list. As the second list led by María Teresa Cabrera (PP) was not approved to run for filing irregularities, the election was imminent. With 97 votes in favor, Sagasti was elected President of Congress, and was inaugurated on the next day as President of Peru to fulfill the 2016-2021 term.

2021 presidential election
In September 2020, the Purple Party formally signed a political accord with Citizen Force, a political party which lacks registration in order to participate independently or formally allied in an election, in order to prepare for the 2021 general election. As a result of this accord, LGBT activist Susel Paredes registered in the party. Initially slated for the ticket as a possible running-mate for Julio Guzmán, she was ultimately selected to lead the congressional list for the Lima constituency.

On 23 October 2020, former Miraflores mayoral candidate, Alejandro San Martín, officially registered an alternative ticket for the primary election. Two days later, congresswoman Carolina Lizárraga announced her candidacy for the Purple Party's presidential nomination. Facing a competitive primary, Julio Guzmán filed his ticket on 28 October 2020. Choosing former Minister of Education, Flor Pablo, and congressman Francisco Sagasti, as his first and second running mate, his campaign was put on halt as the 2020 Peruvian protests started. Negotiations on which Purple congressman would assume the presidency were tumultuous, as Sagasti was viewed as the only consensus candidate for the role. Reports stated Guzmán ultimately accepted the proposal, thus making Sagasti quit the ticket as second running mate in order to assume the presidency until July 2021.

On the primary election held on 29 November 2020, Guzmán was selected as the party's presidential nominee with 77% of the vote, while Carolina Lizárraga placed second with 19.2%, and Alejandro San Martín attained only 3.8%. Guzmán ultimately placed 10th in the election with 2.3% of the vote. The party only won 3 seats in the congressional election. The party was supposed to be dissolved after the 2021 elections on 9 September 2021 but on October 2, 2021, the public hearing was held before the plenary session of the National Elections Jury and, that same day, the resolution was issued which, according to Tello, revoked the ROP resolution and returned the party's registration.

Post-presidency

At the 2022 regional and municipal elections, the Purple Party had their worst performance ever in their electoral history as the party failed to achieve office at this level.

In Congress, the party remained ambivalent in the impeachment processes against Pedro Castillo. In August 2022, congressman Edward Málaga refused to join the Integrity and Development caucus, leaving the Purple Party with only two representatives. Four months later, Susel Paredes announced she was quitting the party, leaving only Flor Pablo as the only purple congressman so far.

Election results

Presidential election

Elections to the Congress of the Republic

References

Politics of Peru
Political parties established in 2016
Social liberal parties